Qualifying industrial zones (QIZs) are business parks that are recognised as free trade zones in collaboration with Israel and the United States. Jordan is one of two countries to have this arrangement, the other being Egypt.

In Jordan, the QIZs are:

 Al-Hassan Industrial Estate
 Al-Hussein Ibn Abdullah II Industrial Estate
 Jordan Industrial Estate Corporation
 Jordan Cyber City
 Al-Tajamouat Industrial Estate
 Gateway QIZ
 Aqaba Industrial Estate
 Ad-Dulayl Industrial Park 
 El-Zai Ready-wear Manufacturing Company

See also
 Qualifying industrial zone
 Economy of Jordan

Economy of Jordan
Special economic zones